Aoyama Station (青山駅) is the name of three train stations in Japan:

 Aoyama Station (Aichi)
 Aoyama Station (Iwate) 
 Aoyama Station (Niigata)